John Keogh may refer to:

John Keogh (1740–1817), Irish merchant and political activist
John K'Eogh (1681–1754), Irish doctor of divinity and naturalist
John Keogh (footballer), Irish soccer player
John Keogh (RTÉ), Irish cultural personality